Uwe Möhrle (born 3 December 1979) is a German former professional footballer who played as a defender.

References

External links
 
 

1979 births
Living people
German footballers
Association football defenders
Germany B international footballers
FC Hansa Rostock players
MSV Duisburg players
VfL Wolfsburg players
FC Augsburg players
FC Energie Cottbus players
Bundesliga players
2. Bundesliga players
3. Liga players
People from Überlingen
Sportspeople from Tübingen (region)
Footballers from Baden-Württemberg